Gimhae International Airport Station is a station of the BGLRT Line of Busan Metro in Daejeo-dong, Gangseo District, Busan, South Korea.

BGLRT connects Gimhae and Busan International Airport with two western outreaches of the Busan Metro system. Gimhae International Airport Station thus as the name implies acts as the embarkation/disembarkation point for rail passengers for Busan International Airport near Gimhae. BGLRT connects with other lines in the Busan Metro at Daejeo (Metro Line 3) and Sasang (Metro Line 2).

Station Layout

See also
 Gimhae International Airport

External links
  Cyber station information from Busan Transportation Corporation

Busan Metro stations
Busan–Gimhae Light Rail Transit
Gangseo District, Busan
Railway stations opened in 2011
Airport railway stations in South Korea
2011 establishments in South Korea